Kurtén is a surname that may refer to:

 Björn Kurtén (1924–1988), Finnish paleontologist
 Joachim Kurtén (1836–1899), Finnish politician
 Martin Kurtén (born 1935), Finnish actor who acted in the 1979 film Herr Puntila and His Servant Matti

Surnames